Paul Speckmann (born September 28, 1963) is an American bassist and singer from Chicago, Illinois. He currently lives in Uherské Hradiště, Czechia.

Biography
Speckmann formed his first band, Warcry, in 1982. He recorded the demo Trilogy of Terror with them in 1983, before starting the death metal band Master. This project was quickly put on hold, however, and Speckmann launched Death Strike, with whom he recorded the Fuckin' Death demo in 1985. This was later re-released on Nuclear Blast as a full album with additional tracks, in 1991. In 1985, Master got back together and released 85 Demo. In 1990, they issued a split EP with Abomination, a band with which Speckmann recorded a self-titled album the same year and Tragedy Strikes two years later.

Between 1990 and 1999, Speckmann released four studio albums and several demos with Master, another album and an EP with Abomination, one-off recordings each with the groups Walpurgisnacht, Solutions, and Martyr, and finally, a self-titled album with his own Speckmann Project.
In 1999, he was invited to join the Czech death metal band Krabathor, with whom Master had previously toured. He recorded the albums Unfortunately Dead (2000) and Dissuade Truth (2003) with them, while also publishing new material with Master, whose latest release, the EP Widower, came out in 2019.

Discography

with Master

Studio albums
 Master (1990)
 On the Seventh Day God Created... Master (1992)
 Collection of Souls (1993)
 Faith Is in Season (1998)
 Let's Start a War (2002)
 Unreleased 1985 Album (2003)
 The Spirit of the West (2004)
 Four More Years of Terror (2005)
 Slaves to Society (2007)
 The Human Machine (2010)
 The New Elite (2012)
 The Witch Hunt (2013)
 An Epiphany of Hate (2016)
 Vindictive Miscreant (2018)

EPs
 Master/Abomination split EP (1990)
 Master/Excision split EP (1996)
 Follow Your Savior (2001)
 Imperial Anthems Master/Pentagram Chile split EP (2013)
 Decay Into Inferior Conditions Master/Dehuman split EP (2017)
 Widower (2019)

Live albums
 Live in Mexico City (2000)
 Live Assault (DVD – 2013)
 Mangled Dehumanization (2016)
 Live (2018)
 God of Thunder (2019)
 Alive in Athens (2020)

Compilations
 Masterpieces (2005)
 Command Your Fate (The Demo Collection) (2017)
 Best of (2018)

Demos
 85 Demo (1985)
 Demo '91 (1991)
 Final Word (1995)
 Everything Is Rotten (2005)

with Abomination
 Abomination (1990)
 Tragedy Strikes (1992)
 The Final War EP (1999)
 Curses of the Deadly Sin (1999)

with Krabathor
 Unfortunately Dead (2000)
 Dissuade Truth (2003)

Other projects
 Warcry – Trilogy of Terror (demo, 1983)
 Death Strike – Fuckin' Death (demo, 1985)
 Death Strike – Fuckin' Death (1991)
 Speckmann Project – Speckmann Project (1991)
 Walpurgisnacht – Live Demo (demo, 1997)
 Solutions – Solutions (1999)
 Martyr – Murder X: The End of the Game (2000)
 Speckmann – ...God Created Master (The Early Years) (2001)
 The Architects of Hate – Pure Hate EP (2008)
 Johansson–Speckmann – Sulphur Skies (2013)
 Johansson–Speckmann – Mask of the Treacherous (2014)
 Cadaveric Poison – Cadaveric Poison (2016)
 Speckmann Project – Fiends of Emptiness'' (2022)

References

External links
 Master/Paul Speckmann official website
 Paul Speckmann alternate website

American heavy metal singers
American heavy metal bass guitarists
American male bass guitarists
American expatriates in the Czech Republic
Singers from Chicago
1963 births
Living people
Guitarists from Chicago
20th-century American bass guitarists
20th-century American male musicians